Törles Tim Knöll (born 13 September 1997) is a German professional footballer who plays as a forward for  Vukovar 1991.

Career
In February 2018, 1. FC Nürnberg announced Knöll would join the club for the 2018–19 season from Hamburger SV II.

On 22 August 2019, Knöll joined Wehen Wiesbaden on a season-long loan deal.

Knöll left 1. FC Nürnberg in August 2020 joining Croatian First Football League side Slaven Belupo.

References

External links

1997 births
Living people
Footballers from Frankfurt
German footballers
Association football forwards
Germany youth international footballers
Germany under-21 international footballers
Bundesliga players
2. Bundesliga players
3. Liga players
Regionalliga players
Croatian Football League players
Hamburger SV II players
Hamburger SV players
1. FC Nürnberg players
SV Wehen Wiesbaden players
NK Slaven Belupo players
Türkgücü München players
Kickers Offenbach players
German expatriate footballers
German expatriate sportspeople in Croatia
Expatriate footballers in Croatia